The 2017 Healthy Ageing Tour was a women's cycle stage race that is being held in the Netherlands from 4 to 8 April 2018. The 2017 edition of the race was the seventh running of the Healthy Ageing Tour, being held with a UCI rating of 2.1.

Route

Classification leadership table
In the 2017 Healthy Ageing Tour, six different jerseys were awarded. For the general classification, calculated by adding each cyclist's finishing times on each stage, and allowing time bonuses for the first three finishers at intermediate sprints and at the finish of mass-start stages, the leader received a yellow jersey. This classification was considered the most important of the 2018 Healthy Ageing Tour, and the winner of the classification was considered the winner of the race.

Additionally, there was a points classification, which awarded a green jersey. In the points classification, cyclists received points for finishing in the top 15 in a stage. For winning a stage, a rider earned 25 points, with 20 for second, 16 for third, 14 for fourth, 12 for fifth, 10 for sixth with a point fewer per place down to a single point for 15th place. The third classification was the sprints classification, the leader of which was awarded an orange jersey. In the sprints classification, riders received points for finishing in the top three at intermediate sprint points during each stage.

The fourth jersey represented the young rider classification, marked by a white jersey. This was decided in the same way as the general classification, but only riders born after 1 January 1996 were eligible to be ranked in the classification. Other jerseys were awarded to the best club rider amongst the amateur riders (blue), and for the most courageous rider showing fighting spirit (purple). There was also a classification for teams, in which the times of the best three cyclists per team on each stage were added together; the leading team at the end of the race was the team with the lowest total time.

See also
2017 in women's road cycling

Notes

References

Sources

External links

2017 in women's road cycling
2017 in Dutch sport
2017